Cormac Ua Ruadhrachh (d 1053) was an Irish priest  in the eleventh century: the only recorded Archdeacon of Fore.

His death is listed in the Annals of the Four Masters.

References

Archdeacons in Ireland
11th-century Irish priests
1053 deaths
People from County Westmeath